José Carlos Cataño (born 30 August 1954 in La Laguna, Canary Islands) is a Spanish poet.

Bibliography

Poetry
 Jules Rock. 1973, L'Oreille Qui Voit Tout, Santa Cruz de Tenerife (1975)
 Disparos en el paraíso, Edicions del Mall, Barcelona (1982)
 Muerte sin ahí, Edicions del Mall, Barcelona (1986)
 El cónsul del mar del Norte, Editorial Pre-Textos, Valencia (1990)
 A las islas vacías, Ave del Paríso Ediciones, Madrid (1997)
 En tregua, Plaza & Janés, Barcelona (2001)
 El amor lejano. Poesía reunida, 1975-2005, Reverso Ediciones, Barcelona (2006)
 Lugares que fueron tu rostro (2000-2007), Editorial Bruguera, Barcelona (2008)

Prose
 El exterminio de la luz, Taller Ediciones Josefina Betancor, Madrid (1975), Premio de Edición Benito Pérez Armas de Novela 1974
 De tu boca a los cielos, Edicions del Mall, Barcelona (1985) y Anroart, Las Palmas de Gran Canaria (2007), segunda edición, revisada y corregida
 Madame, Ediciones Península, Barcelona (1989)
 Los que cruzan el mar. Diarios, 1974-2004, Editorial Pre-Textos, Valencia (2004)
 Aurora y exilio. Escritos, 1980-2006, La Caja Literaria, Santa Cruz de Tenerife, (2007)
 Cien de Canarias. Una lectura de la poesía insular entre 1950 y 2000, Ediciones Idea, Colección Cabrera y Galdós, Santa Cruz de Tenerife, (2008)

External links 

1954 births
Spanish poets
Living people
Spanish male poets